Lizard (とかげ) is a short story collection by Banana Yoshimoto, written in 1993 and translated into English in 1995 by Ann Sherif. It is a collection of six short stories on love and the healing power of time. 

In the American edition Banana dedicates her book to Kurt Cobain.

Contents

 "Newlywed"
 "Lizard"
 "Helix"
 "Dreaming of Kimchee"
 "Blood and Water"
 "A Strange Tale from Down by the River"

Book information
Lizard (English edition) by Banana Yoshimoto
Hardcover -  published by Grove Press
Paperback - , published by Pocket Books

External links
 Lizard at Bananamania
Lizard Review

1993 short story collections
Japanese short story collections
Japanese magic realism novels